Jimmy Hunter is a former association football player who represented and captained New Zealand at international level.

Hunter played three official A-international matches for New Zealand in 1954, all against trans-Tasman neighbours Australia, the first a 2–1 win on 14 August, followed by consecutive 1-4 losses  on 28 August and 4 September respectively.

Hunter began his football at Arthurlie F.C. in Scotland before being recruited by Chelsea F.C. Hunter played for Canterbury City F.C. of Kent, England before moving to New Zealand where he played for Mangakino. Hunter was also selected to represent the North Island in 1953 and 1954.

In 1955 Hunter transferred to Eastern Union of Gisborne, and in 1956 moved to the South Island to play for Christchurch Technical Old Boys.

Hunter retired from playing in 1958, continuing as a selector for Technical Old Boys.

References 

Year of birth missing (living people)
Living people
New Zealand association footballers
New Zealand international footballers
Association footballers not categorized by position